The Creighton University School of Dentistry is the dental school of Creighton University. It is located in the city of Omaha, Nebraska. It was one of the first dental schools in the United States, having been established in 1905.

Since Creighton University School of Dentistry does not offer residency positions in specialty programs, students are given the opportunity to perform advanced dental procedures including oral surgery, dental implants, etc. Creighton students are prepared to enter residency programs or dental practice, or continue with advanced degrees and specialty training. Approximately 25% of Creighton graduates in the School of Dentistry continue on to earn a specialty degree.  Creighton built a new building to house the dental school at 2109 Cuming Street, which was completed in the fall of 2018.

Research 

Research in the School of Dentistry has expanded over the last decade with growing extramural funding from the National Institutes of Health (NIH), the Agency for Health Care Research and Quality (AHRQ), and numerous foundations and international corporations. The school has active research programs in basic biological and material sciences, health services and translational and clinical trials. Extramural research funding totaled nearly $1.5 million for 2016-2017.

Dental students engage in research early in their academic careers, participating in research projects as part of courses requirement. They are also invited to participate in faculty research projects.

The National Institute of Craniofacial Research (NIDCR) recognizes Creighton as being in the 30th percentile of the nation's dental schools for research funding.

The Creighton University School of Dentistry has international research partnerships with Nihon University, Department of Operative Dentistry, in Tokyo, Japan; and Shofu Corporation in Kyoto, Japan.  Two faculty members from the School of Dentistry at Nihon University School of Dentistry have completed one-year research fellowships at Creighton and a third scholar is scheduled to start in July 2015.  An industrial scholar from the Department of Research and development at Shofu Corporation has also completed a one-year fellowship. These academic and industrial fellowships have resulted in several research abstracts being presented at national and international research meeting and publications in peer-reviewed journals. The Creighton University School of Dentistry plans to encourage more research collaborations at the international level.

Faculty-driven research at the School of Dentistry ranges from basic sciences to clinical investigations, including a variety of materials and techniques with translational potential into clinical applications to provide better care to patients.

Departments 
Creighton University School of Dentistry includes the following departments:
 Department of Community and Preventive Dentistry
 Department of Diagnostic Sciences
 Department of Dental Radiology
 Department of Oral Biology
 Department of General Dentistry
 Department of Pediatric Dentistry and Orthodontics
 Department of Fixed and Removable Prosthodontics
 Department of Oral and Maxillofacial Surgery 
 Department of Endodontics
 Department of Periodontics

Accreditation 
Creighton University School of Dentistry is currently accredited by the American Dental Association (ADA).

Admissions
The School of Dentistry accepts an average of 115 students per year, with several thousand applicants from around the United States applying each year.

Location
The School of Dentistry is located near downtown Omaha. It is set off to the edge of the main Creighton University campus.

Media
The Creighton School of Dentistry was featured on several websites for the music video "Wax it Fresh and Carve it Smooth" created by Creighton dental students.

See also

 American Student Dental Association

References 

Dental schools in Nebraska
Dentistry
Jesuit universities and colleges in the United States